David McKay (born 17 June 1998) is a Scottish professional footballer who plays as a defender for Queen of the South.

Club career

Youth career
McKay started his career in the Hibernian youth ranks before transferring to Raith Rovers.

Senior career
in 2019, McKay signed a contract extension at Stark's Park until the end of the 2019-20 season.

McKay was part of the Raith Rovers squad that won the 2021-22 Scottish Challenge Cup versus Queen of the South, appearing as an 83rd minute substitute for Liam Dick.

After a loan spell with Edinburgh City during the 2021-22 season, McKay signed permanently for the Palmerston club in Dumfries during the 2022 close season.

Honours

Club
 Raith Rovers
Scottish Challenge Cup : 2021-22

Career statistics

References

External links
David McKay on Soccerbase

1998 births
Living people
Scottish footballers
Scottish Football League players
Association football defenders
Hibernian F.C. players
Raith Rovers F.C. players
F.C. Edinburgh players
Queen of the South F.C. players
Sportspeople from Livingston, West Lothian
Footballers from West Lothian